Michael Francis McAuliffe (November 22, 1920 - January 6, 2006) was an American prelate of the Roman Catholic Church. He served as the second bishop of the Diocese of Jefferson City in Missouri.

Biography

Early life 
Michael McAuliffe was born on November 22, 1920, in Kansas City, Kansas, the second of six sons of John Joseph McAuliffe and Bridget Agnes (Broderick) McAuliffe.   

McAuliffe attended Our Lady of Good Counsel School and St. John High School Seminary, both in Kansas City. McAuliffe then went to the St. Louis Preparatory Seminary in St. Louis, Missouri, and finally the Theological College of Catholic University of America in Washington, D.C.

McAuliffe was ordained a priest by Bishop Lorenzo Del Ponte at the Cathedral of the Immaculate Conception, on May 31, 1945.

Bishop of Jefferson City 
Upon the resignation of Bishop Joseph M. Marling, Pope Paul VI appointed him the second Bishop of Jefferson City on July 2, 1969. McAuliffe was consecrated and installed by Cardinal Luigi Raimondi on August 18, 1969, at the Cathedral of Saint Joseph in Jefferson City. His motto was "In Truth and Charity."  

In January 1980, McAuliffe appeared before the Missouri General Assembly to support the passage of the Equal Rights Amendment to the US Constitution.

In June 1982, Holy Family Parish in New Haven, Missouri, won a court battle with McAuliffe about the relocation of an ornate marble altar within the church sanctuary.  McAuliffe stated that the guidelines of the Second Vatican Council forced him to relocate the altar.  The judge enjoined McAuliffe and Holy Family to negotiate a compromise solution.

Retirement and legacy 
On June 25, 1997, Pope John Paul II accepted McAuliffe's resignation as bishop of the Diocese of Jefferson City. In February 2003, McAuliffe and the diocese were sued by a North Carolina man who claimed to have been sexually molested by two diocesan priests when he was a child.

Michael McAuliffe died in Kansas City, Missouri, on January 6, 2006.  He is buried at Resurrection Cemetery in Jefferson City.

References

1943 births
2006 deaths
People from Kansas City, Kansas
20th-century Roman Catholic bishops in the United States
Roman Catholic bishops of Jefferson City
Catholics from Kansas